Ahoskie may refer to:
Ahoskie, North Carolina
Ahoskie (YTB-804), a Natick-class large harbor tug in the service of the United States Navy